Phoebe Catherine Holcroft Watson ( Holcroft; 7 October 1898 – 20 October 1980) was a tennis player from the United Kingdom whose best result in singles was reaching the final of the U.S. Championships in 1929, losing to Helen Wills in straight sets. According to A. Wallis Myers, Watson was ranked in the world top 10 in 1926 and from 1928 through 1930, reaching a career high of world No. 2 in 1929.

Watson won the women's doubles title at Wimbledon in 1928 and 1929 and at the US Championships in 1929, all with partner Peggy Saunders Michell. Her other Grand Slam title was the women's doubles at the French Championships in 1928 with partner Eileen Bennett.

She was part of the British team that won the Wightman Cup against the United States in 1928 and 1930.

Grand Slam finals

Singles: 1 (1 runner-up)

Doubles: 5 (4 titles, 1 runners-up)

Grand Slam singles tournament timeline

1Until 1923, the French Championships were open only to French nationals. The World Hard Court Championships (WHCC), actually played on clay in Paris or Brussels, began in 1912 and were open to all nationalities. The results from the 1923 edition of that tournament are shown here. The Olympics replaced the WHCC in 1924, as the Olympics were held in Paris. Beginning in 1925, the French Championships were open to all nationalities, with the results shown here beginning with that year.

See also 
 Performance timelines for all female tennis players who reached at least one Grand Slam final

References

Wimbledon champions (pre-Open Era)
United States National champions (tennis)
French Championships (tennis) champions
1898 births
1980 deaths
Grand Slam (tennis) champions in women's doubles
British female tennis players
Place of birth missing